The Ragged Princess is a 1916 American silent comedy drama film directed by John G. Adolfi and starring June Caprice, Harry Hilliard, and Richard Neill.

Cast
 June Caprice as Alicia Jones 
 Harry Hilliard as Harry Deigan 
 Richard Neill as Thomas Deigan 
 Tom Burrough as Dr. Halpern 
 Florence Ashbrooke as Mrs. Langford 
 Sidney Bracey as Toby Rice 
 Caroline Harris as Housekeeper 
 Jane Lee as Little Jane 
 Katherine Lee as Little Katherine

References

Bibliography
 Solomon, Aubrey. The Fox Film Corporation, 1915-1935: A History and Filmography. McFarland, 2011.

External links

 

1916 films
1916 comedy-drama films
American silent feature films
Films directed by John G. Adolfi
American black-and-white films
Fox Film films
1910s English-language films
1910s American films
Silent American drama films
Silent American comedy-drama films